Смутное Время (Smutnoye Vremia, Russian for "Time of Troubles") is a standalone album by vocalist Valery Kipelov and guitarist Sergey Mavrin, both formerly of Aria (Kipelov was still a member of Aria when it was released). Alik Granovsky, former Aria bassist, was a guest musician on "SV", but composed no songs for it. Songs from the album are still played both by Kipelov's group "Kipelov" and Mavrin's "Mavrik".

Although the major vein of the album is heavy metal, common for both artists, it also includes some slow ballads and even a "drunkard"-blues song, "Vypyem Yesho" (One More Drink).

Track #4, "Ya Svoboden" (I am Free), suddenly became a hit in 2003 when it was re-released by Kipelov and a music video was aired on MTV. The ballad topped Russian rock charts and was featured on MTV Russia's Top 20.

Track listing

Personnel 
Valery Kipelov (Aria) – vocals
Sergey Mavrin – guitar, keyboard
Alik Granovsky (Master) – bass
Pavel Chinyakov – drums
Galina Pavlova, Alexander Zotov, Olga Shumova, Mikhail Seryshev – choir (6)
Sound engineering – Ivan Yevdokimov
Photo – Nadir Chanishev

References

External links 
YouTube - video for "Я Свободен" (2003)
Accords and tabs to the album
Booklet text

1997 albums
Aria (band) albums